Lantern Pike is a hill located just outside Hayfield, in Derbyshire, England. The land lies within the Peak District National Park and is owned and maintained by the National Trust. It is permanently open to the public.

According to the booklet 10 Walks Around Hayfield, published by the Peak District National Park Authority, the name Lantern Pike probably comes from the hill's use as a beacon.

The hill is a popular hiking destination, and is often considered a continuation of nearby Kinder Scout. The Peak District Boundary Walk runs south to north past the summit and the Pennine Bridleway crosses the eastern flank of the hill.

Lantern Pike gives its name to the Lantern Pike Inn in nearby Little Hayfield.

References

Mountains and hills of the Peak District
Mountains and hills of Derbyshire
Mountains and hills of the United Kingdom with toposcopes
High Peak, Derbyshire